The 2003 Nebraska Cornhuskers football team represented the University of Nebraska–Lincoln in the 2003 NCAA Division I-A football season. The team was coached by Frank Solich and played their home games in Memorial Stadium in Lincoln, Nebraska.  After the Colorado game, Solich was fired as head coach. Defensive coordinator Bo Pelini served as interim head coach for the Alamo Bowl.

Schedule

Roster and coaching staff

Depth chart

Game summaries

Oklahoma State

Utah State

Penn State

Southern Miss

Troy State

Missouri

Texas A&M

Iowa State

Texas

Kansas

Kansas State

Colorado

Michigan State

Rankings

After the season
Nebraska finished in 2nd place in the Big 12 North Division and tied for 4th conference-wide, with a final record of 10–3 (5–3). Prior to the season, Head Coach Frank Solich was feeling pressure to perform after a 7–7 (3–5) record the previous year (the first non-winning season since 1961), and had significantly revamped his coaching staff for 2003.

Despite the sweeping changes and the improvements they brought, which helped Nebraska to another 9-win season, Solich was fired at the conclusion of the regular season.  Defensive Coordinator Bo Pelini was named Interim Head Coach and led the Huskers to a 17–3 Alamo Bowl win over Michigan State.  When new Head Coach Bill Callahan was announced in later weeks, most of the existing assistants (including Pelini) were also fired.

Pelini would later return as Callahan's replacement in 2008.

Awards

NFL and pro players
The following Nebraska players who participated in the 2003 season later moved on to the next level and joined a professional or semi-pro team as draftees or free agents.

References

Nebraska
Nebraska Cornhuskers football seasons
Alamo Bowl champion seasons
Nebraska Cornhuskers football